Lawrence County High School is a public high school in Louisa, Kentucky located at 100 Bulldog Lane, Louisa, KY 41230.

History
Lawrence County High School was established in September 1977. It shares its name with the county in which it is located, and offers public education to students of Lawrence County, KY between grades 9-12. The school offers many sports, an Army JROTC program, a vocational department, a music department, and many extracurricular activities.

Students attending LCHS are filtered in three elementary schools and one private Christian school to create a centralized high school. The school is located next to the Lawrence County Board of Education building on campus. The structure itself began as three circles, but has since has had additional additions and renovations.

Notable alumni
 Jason Michael - NFL Offensive Coordinator for the Tennessee Titans
 Gerad Parker - wide receivers coach for Penn State. Former interim head football coach at Purdue.
 Chandler Shepherd - Major League pitcher for the Baltimore Orioles
 Noah Thompson - American Idol season 20 winner

References

External links

Educational institutions in the United States with year of establishment missing
Schools in Lawrence County, Kentucky
Public high schools in Kentucky
Louisa, Kentucky